Andrei Simion Tînc (born 3 July 1985) is a Romanian professional footballer who plays as a defender.

Honours
CFR Cluj
Cupa României: 2015–16

Minaur Baia Mare
Liga III: 2020–21

References

External links
 
 

1985 births
Living people
Sportspeople from Reșița
Romanian footballers
Association football defenders
Liga I players
Liga II players
CSM Reșița players
ACS Sticla Arieșul Turda players
FC Bihor Oradea players
FC UTA Arad players
CSU Voința Sibiu players
FC Rapid București players
CFR Cluj players
CS Luceafărul Oradea players
FC Ripensia Timișoara players
CS Minaur Baia Mare (football) players